The following highways are numbered 531. Route 531, or Highway 531, may refer to:

Australia
 Kiewa Valley Highway

Canada
Alberta Highway 531
 Highway 531 (Ontario)

India
 National Highway 531 (India)

Israel
 Route 531 (Israel)

United States